Emily Anne Staples Tuttle (née Mayer; May 3, 1929 – January 13, 2018) was an American politician.

Born in Minneapolis, Minnesota, she earned her bachelor's degree from the University of Minnesota in 1950 and her master's degree in public administration from the John F. Kennedy School of Government in 1981. Originally a member of the Republican Party, in 1973, she switched to the Democratic Party. From 1977 to 1981, she served in the Minnesota Senate. In 1990, she unsuccessfully ran for the DFL nomination for Lieutenant Governor, with Mike Hatch in 1990. She served on the Hennepin County Board of Commissioners from 1993 to 1995. In 1954, she married Loring M. Staples Jr. who died in 1988; in 1995, Staples married Gedney Tuttle. Emily Anne Staples Tuttle, aged 88, died on January 13, 2018, at United Hospital, in Saint Paul, Minnesota.

Notes

1929 births
2018 deaths
Politicians from Minneapolis
People from Plymouth, Minnesota
People from Wayzata, Minnesota
Harvard Kennedy School alumni
University of Minnesota alumni
Women state legislators in Minnesota
Minnesota Democrats
Minnesota Republicans
County commissioners in Minnesota
Minnesota state senators
20th-century American politicians
20th-century American women politicians
Candidates in the 1990 United States elections
21st-century American women